Esther van Berkel (born ) is a Dutch volleyball player. She is part of the Netherlands women's national volleyball team.

She participated in the 2014 FIVB Volleyball World Grand Prix.
On club level she played for Saint-Cloud Paris SF in 2014.

References

External links
 Profile at FIVB.org

1990 births
Living people
Dutch women's volleyball players
People from Veghel
Sportspeople from North Brabant